Baroness Ritchie may refer to:

 Shireen Ritchie, Baroness Ritchie of Brompton (1945–2012), British politician
 Margaret Ritchie, Baroness Ritchie of Downpatrick (born 1958), Irish politician